The England cricket team toured Australia from November 2006 to February 2007 for a five-match Test series that formed The Ashes, a triangular One Day International series with Australia and New Zealand, one Twenty20 International against Australia, and tour matches against Australian domestic sides and select XIs.

Australia regained the Ashes fifteen months after relinquishing them by winning the first three Test matches, sealing the series with a 206-run victory in the third Test at the WACA Ground. Australia went on to win the series 5-0, the first such Ashes whitewash since 1920-21. Australia were winners in a one-off Twenty20 International at Sydney Cricket Ground, the hosts prevailing by 77 runs. England were triumphant, however, in the Commonwealth Bank Series, beating Australia 2-0 in a best-of-three final.

Squads

On 14 November, Marcus Trescothick left the tour due to a “recurrence of a stress-related illness”, with Ed Joyce named as his replacement. On 16 December, Ashley Giles returned home for personal reasons; Jamie Dalrymple was called up in his place.

On 18 November, Michael Clarke was brought into the Australia squad as injury cover for Shane Watson. On 8 December, Damien Martyn announced his retirement from all forms of cricket with immediate effect. Andrew Symonds and Adam Voges were brought into the team as replacements.

Tour matches

Test series

Twenty20 International

One Day International series

Notes

References
 Playfair Cricket Annual
 Wisden Cricketers Almanack

2006 in cricket
2007 in cricket
England
2006-07
2006 in English cricket
2007 in English cricket
2006-07
2006 in Australian cricket
2007 in Australian cricket
International cricket competitions in 2006–07